15262 Abderhalden, provisional designation , is a carbonaceous Themistian asteroid from the outer region of the asteroid belt, approximately 12 kilometers in diameter.

It was discovered by German astronomers Freimut Börngen and Lutz Schmadel at the Karl Schwarzschild Observatory in Tautenburg, eastern Germany, on 12 October 1990. The asteroid was named after Swiss physiologist and biochemist Emil Abderhalden.

Orbit and classification 

Abderhalden is a member of the Themis family, a dynamical family of outer-belt asteroids with nearly coplanar ecliptical orbits. It orbits the Sun in the outer main-belt at a distance of 2.8–3.7 AU once every 5 years and 9 months (2,102 days). Its orbit has an eccentricity of 0.14 and an inclination of 1° with respect to the ecliptic. The first precovery was obtained at Crimea–Nauchnij in 1978, extending the asteroid's observation arc by 12 years prior to its discovery.

Physical characteristics

Rotation period 

In October 2013, a rotational lightcurve of Abderhalden was obtained from photometric observation taken by astronomers at the Palomar Transient Factory in California. Lightcurve analysis gave a rotation period of  hours with a brightness variation of 0.21 magnitude.

Diameter and albedo 

The Collaborative Asteroid Lightcurve Link assumes an albedo of 0.08, a standard albedo for carbonaceous asteroids of the Themis family, and calculates a diameter of 8.4 kilometers, while the NEOWISE mission of NASA's space-based Wide-field Infrared Survey Explorer finds an albedo of 0.062 with a corresponding diameter of 12.2 kilometers and an absolute magnitude of 13.2.

Naming 

This minor planet was named in memory of Swiss biochemist and physiologist Emil Abderhalden (1877–1950). He was a researcher in the field of physiological chemistry, founder of modern dietetics, and promoter of public welfare. Abderhalden taught physiology at the Martin Luther University of Halle-Wittenberg from 1911 until the end of World War II. The approved naming citation was published by the Minor Planet Center on 13 October 2000 .

References

External links 
 Asteroid Lightcurve Database (LCDB), query form (info )
 Dictionary of Minor Planet Names, Google books
 Asteroids and comets rotation curves, CdR – Observatoire de Genève, Raoul Behrend
 Discovery Circumstances: Numbered Minor Planets (15001)-(20000) – Minor Planet Center
 
 

015262
Discoveries by Freimut Börngen
Discoveries by Lutz D. Schmadel
Named minor planets
19901012